Johnathan Ray "Jon" Lancaster is an American farmer and politician currently serving in the Mississippi House of Representatives, having first been elected in 2019. He is a Republican.

Biography 
Jonathan Ray Lancaster was born in Amory, Mississippi. He has graduated from Houston High School. In 2019, he was elected to represent Mississippi's 22nd House district as a Democrat in the Mississippi House of Representatives for the 2020–2024 term. He was inaugurated on January 7, 2020. Jon Lancaster switched from the Democratic to the Republican Party in November 2021.

References 

Living people
Year of birth missing (living people)
Members of the Mississippi House of Representatives
Mississippi Democrats
Mississippi Republicans